World of Illusion Starring Mickey Mouse and Donald Duck is a platform game developed and published by Sega for the Sega Genesis. The game was released in December 1992, and is part of Sega's Illusion series of Mickey Mouse games. The game was included on the Sega Genesis Mini.

Plot
Whilst preparing for a magical act, Mickey Mouse and Donald Duck discover a magical box. This turns out to belong to an evil magician (Pete) who sends Mickey and Donald to a magical world. Mickey and Donald must now work together in order to find a way back home.

Gameplay

Players can either play solo as either Mickey Mouse or Donald Duck, or co-operatively with two players controlling Mickey and Donald while sharing from the same pool of tries. Mickey and Donald can run, jump, or attack by flourishing their capes. Enemies defeated in this way turn into doves, cards, or other harmless objects depending on the enemy. After defeating the boss of each level, a new magic spell is learned, allowing the pair to traverse the next level; i.e. flying on a magic carpet or going underwater in an air bubble. The gameplay changes significantly depending on the characters chosen. For example, Mickey can squeeze through certain gaps, while Donald must find a different route, leading him to entirely different realms. When playing in two-player mode, the players can stand on each other's shoulders and use ropes to help each other out, and Mickey can pull Donald through gaps his (evidently very stiff) tail feathers prevent him from fitting through.

World of Illusion comprises five principal stages named the 'Enchanted Forest', 'Among the Clouds', 'Underwater Adventure', 'The Library', and 'The Magic Box'. There also exist, within these five stages, three sets of sub-stages (some of which are optional) which are accessible only while playing either as Mickey or as Donald in one-player mode, or in two-player mode.

Design
The game's music, artwork and animation shows influences from Disney animated films, including Snow White and the Seven Dwarfs, Pinocchio, Fantasia, Sleeping Beauty, The Sword in the Stone, and The Little Mermaid. Some of the influences are directly literal, such as the appearance of the playing-card soldiers from Disney's 1951 film adaptation of Alice in Wonderland, in the castle-garden section of the 'Magic Box' stage.

Reception
MegaTech gave the game 90% and a Hyper Game Award, saying that it had "the best graphics of any Disney game yet", but said that it was very easy to finish. Mega gave the game an 82% score, saying it was "very easy to complete, and dull in one-player, but fantastic for a couple of youngsters". Bad Influence! scored it a full 10 out of 10 stars. In 2017, Gamesradar ranked the game 22nd on their: "Best Sega Genesis/Mega Drive games of all time".

See also
 List of Disney video games

References

External links
 

1992 video games
Cooperative video games
Disney video games
Donald Duck video games
Mickey Mouse video games
Platform games
Sega video games
Sega Genesis games
Sega Genesis-only games
Video games developed in Japan
Multiplayer and single-player video games